Haiming is a municipality and the name of its largest town, located in the district of Imst in the Austrian state of Tyrol.

Geography
The town of Haiming is located 11 km east of Imst. The municipality consists eight villages.

Climate

Population

Economy
Its main source of income is summer tourism.

References

Cities and towns in Imst District